WatchShop is a UK online watch retailer. Established in 2007, it was acquired by the UK's largest luxury jeweller, Aurum Holdings Ltd., in 2014. It carries high-street and designer watches and jewellery from brands including Raymond Weil, Coach, and Frédérique Constant.

History
The company was initially registered under the name of S D K Jewellers Ltd., and launched as part of the Reading-based jewellery retailer SDK Jewellers, which was founded in 1991 by Sham Naib.

Naib's son, Kishore Naib, joined the business in 2007 and established the website www.watchshop.com. SDK Jewellers was officially renamed Watch Shop Ltd. in January 2013.

In June 2011, the company launched its first TV ad campaign, which aired across UK digital channels including ITV2, E4, More4 and Sky News.

Aurum Holdings is the UK's largest luxury jeweller and owns retailers such as Goldsmiths, Mappin & Webb and Watches of Switzerland. It purchased the company in 2014.

In April 2017, the company began selling sunglasses from designer brands including Ray-Ban, Nike and Emporio Armani.

Charitable activities
In March 2011, the company partnered with Casio to raise relief funds for the 2011 Tohoku earthquake and tsunami.

In September 2016, the company worked with Guess watches and the Get In Touch Foundation to raise money for Breast Cancer Awareness.

Cultural references
In 2011, the company supplied The X Factor TalkBack Thames production team with Casio watches.

Awards

References

Online jewellery retailers of the United Kingdom
British companies established in 2007
Manufacturing companies established in 2007
Retail companies established in 2007
Internet properties established in 2007
Eyewear retailers of the United Kingdom
Companies based in Reading, Berkshire